Albanians in Hungary are ethnic Albanians living in Hungary. Albanians appeared in larger groups in Hungary fleeing from the Turks. Until the beginning of the 20th century, they also formed a special ethnic community in Syrmia. This community ceased in 1921 and has since arrived in the 1990s as a temporary worker or political refugee. Their number is not significant, but 250-300 of the 1300 bakeries in Hungary are operated by Albanians.

History
Between 1749 and 1755, about 2,000 Albanians, who left their homeland under Ottoman rule, settled in the historical territory of Hungary, in the south of Serbia, in the east of the Sremska Mitrovica, three settlements of the Rumai district - Jarak, Hertkovce and Nikince. Their contemporary Hungarian name is derived from the Albanian name: Kelemenc, Clementines or Clementines. Catholic Albanians (Gegs) settling in the wide floodplain of the Sava deal with grape growing and sheep-keeping, and until the early 20th century preserved their autonomy and their specific material and intellectual culture. Several Hungarian historians and ethnographers have dealt with the language and way of life of Albanian inclusion in the Serbian (Károly Windisch, Gottlieb, Dániel Cornides, Lajos Thallóczy, Edgár Palóczi). The census of 1900 wrote 4438 Albanian native speakers from the three villages, and by 1921 their number fell to nine (!), With the vast majority returning to their independent country, Albania, in 1912.

From the early 1990s, during the Balkans and especially during the Kosovo War, thousands, mostly Kosovo Albanians, fled to Hungary, but most of them considered the country to be a further western destination. Until now, illegal immigration has not ceased, and Albanians staying in Serbia are constantly being seized and deported by the Border Guard.

Notable people
 Gjon Delhusa –  singer, composer and lyricist
 Kálmán Ihász – footballer
 Ignác Martinovics –  philosopher, writer and a leader of the Hungarian Jacobin movement
 Andrei Mocioni –  jurist, politician, and informal leader of the ethnic Romanian community; part-Albanian

References

Hungary
 
Ethnic groups in Hungary